This list comprises all players who have participated in at least one league match for LA Galaxy II since the team's first USL season in 2014.

A "†" denotes players who only appeared in a single match.

A
 Adonis Amaya
 Hugo Arellano †
 Eder Arreola
 André Auras

B
 Kainoa Bailey
 Jason Bli
 Travis Bowen
 Edson Buddle

C
 Laurent Courtois
 Alejandro Covarrubias

D
 A. J. DeLaGarza †
 Bradley Diallo
 Clément Diop
 Aleksandar Đoković
 Todd Dunivant

E
 Logan Emory

F
 Joe Franco
 Ryo Fujii

G
 Rafael Garcia

H
 Chandler Hoffman
 Baggio Husidić †

J
 Bradford Jamieson IV
 Malcolm Jones †

L
 Ariel Lassiter
 Cody Laurendi
 Leonardo †
 Sebastian Lletget †

M
 Ignacio Maganto
 Elijah Martin
 Jack McBean
 Raúl Mendiola
 Tommy Meyer

N
 Lee Nishanian

O
 Bryan Olivera
 Christian Onalfo
 Kofi Opare
 Rey Ortiz †

P
 Brian Perk

R
 Robbie Rogers
 David Romney
 Brian Rowe
 Charlie Rugg

S
 Marcelo Sarvas †
 Oscar Sorto
 Daniel Steres
 Dragan Stojkov

V
 Kyle Venter
 Adrian Vera
 Jaime Villarreal
 Jose Villarreal

W
 Kenney Walker
 Andrew Wolverton †

Z
 Gyasi Zardes †
 Ethan Zubak

External links

LA Galaxy II
 
Association football player non-biographical articles